Gambling in China is illegal under Chinese law and has been officially outlawed since the Communist Party took power in 1949. Any form of gambling by Chinese citizens, including online-gambling, gambling overseas, opening casinos overseas to attract citizens of China as primary customers, is considered illegal. In practice however, Chinese citizens participate in state-run lotteries, regularly travel to legal gambling centers overseas or in the special administrative regions of Hong Kong and Macau and access gaming through offshore based proxy betting and online gambling companies.

Mainland China
The Criminal Code of Republican China has prohibited both public gambling and the provision of venues for gamblers to assemble (e.g., casinos) since 1935. Under the law, gamblers are allowed to play cards for non-currency items like matchsticks and citizens can play games like mahjong at Chinese New Year under "temporary amusement" clauses.

The Chinese Communist government operates two lotteries: the Welfare Lottery and the Sports Lottery set up in 1987 and 1994 respectively. The Chinese government does not legally consider the lotteries a form of gambling. Illegal gambling in China remains common, including unofficial lotteries, clandestine casinos, and betting in games such as mahjong and various card games. In 2010, The Daily Telegraph (UK) reported that an estimated one trillion yuan are wagered in illegal gambling every year in China. Problem gambling exists in the country, and may be more prevalent than in countries with legalized gambling. Online gambling is another outlet for illegal gambling in the country.

Various attempts have been made to establish legal casinos in mainland China, although these have been unsuccessful.

In June 2018, the Chinese Government banned all online poker applications. App stores had to remove all poker related applications, and the promotion of poker in general via all social media channels in China (Wechat, Weibo) became forbidden.

Hong Kong

While some aspects of mainland Chinese law apply in Hong Kong, certain forms of gambling are legal and regulated in Hong Kong. The Law of Hong Kong is based on English common law, having been a British territory until 1997. Gambling in Hong Kong has been regulated since 1977. The Hong Kong Jockey Club organizes much of the legal betting in the region.

Macau

Gambling in Macau has been legal since the 1850s, when it was a Portuguese colony. The region has a history of gambling on traditional Chinese games. Gambling in Macau now primarily takes place in Western-style casinos; in 2007, Macau overtook the Las Vegas Strip in gaming revenues. , 38 casinos operate in Macau, and the region's annual gambling revenues exceed US$27.9 billion.

Offshore gambling
Legal restrictions on onshore gambling in Mainland China have contributed to the growth of overseas and online gambling sites that cater to Chinese nationals. Integrated gaming resorts in Singapore, Australia, Korea, Vietnam and the Philippines welcome growing numbers of Chinese tourists.

Proxy betting
As in person visits to offshore gambling venues can be both time consuming and attract the attention of law enforcement, proxy betting has grown in popularity, especially for VIP clients wishing to discretely place high stakes bets. In proxy betting, clients communicate with staffers wearing headsets at baccarat tables in offshore casinos. Proxy betting was outlawed in Macau in 2016 and has never been permitted in Australia or Singapore casinos, but now accounts for 40 percent of the $1 billion VIP gaming market in the Philippines, according to brokerage CICC.

Online gambling
Online gambling in Mainland China remains illegal, however internet traffic routed via VPNs, underground banking networks and payment platforms enable Mainland Chinese customers to access and remit funds to online gaming sites. According to 2019 estimates published in Economic Information Daily, an affiliate of state-owned news agency Xinhua, the annual amount bet through online gambling in the Mainland is more than one trillion yuan (US$145 billion), equivalent to nearly twice the annual income of China’s officially sanctioned lotteries.

In the Philippines alone, where Philippine Offshore Gaming Operators (POGOs) can register and legally operate, over a three-year period from 2016 at least 100,000 Chinese nationals were estimated to have moved to Manila to work for online gambling operators as marketing agents, tech support specialists and IT engineers to serve Mandarin-speaking clientele. To side step restrictions on direct marketing of online gambling in Mainland Chinese print or social media, many online gaming sites seeking to attract Chinese customers have become shirt sponsors for English Premier League football teams. Dafabet’s sponsorship of Fulham FC and W88’s sponsorship of Wolverhampton Wanderers are just two examples of this trend.

In October 2014, The Guardian newspaper reported that one major online site, Bet365 had been taking bets from Chinese citizens by using obscure domain names in order to avoid government web censorship.

See also
2004 Chinese lottery scandal

References

External links
China Sports Lottery official website